K5 – The War of Words Demos is a compilation album by heavy metal band Fight, released on November 28, 2007. It mostly consists of demo recordings originally made in July 1992 in Phoenix, Arizona, of what would become their 1993 debut release War of Words, and also includes five new songs.

Track listing

Notes
 "Beast Denies" is an early version of "Reality, a New Beginning" from War of Words, but with different lyrics
 "Dead Men Talk" contains some parts that would later end up in the song "Human Crate" from A Small Deadly Space
 "Psycho Suicide" would be re-recorded and be featured as a hidden track after a two-minute silence on "In a World of My Own Making" from A Small Deadly Space

Personnel
Fight
 Rob Halford – vocals
 Brian Tilse – guitars
 Russ Parrish – guitars
 Jay Jay – bass
 Scott Travis – drums

Production
 Produced by Rob Halford
 Executive producer – John Baxter
Tracks 1–4, 6, 8–10, and 15–16 are multitrack mixes, mixed by Roy Z in 2006
Tracks 5, 7, and 11–14 are DAT demos, mixed by Rob Halford in 1992
Mastered by Tom Baker
Cover illustration/art design – Marc Sasso
Booklet layout/additional art – Attila Juhasz
Photography – Neil Zlozower, William Hames, John Baxter

Fight (band) albums